Parliamentary elections were held in Cyprus on 21 May 2006. AKEL and the Democratic Rally both won 18 of the 56 seats. Voter turnout was 89.0%.

Results

Notes

References

2006 in Cyprus
2000s in Cypriot politics
Cyprus
Legislative elections in Cyprus
May 2006 events in Europe